Yeşilhisar is a village in the Hocalar District, Afyonkarahisar Province, Turkey. Its population is 1,514 (2021). Before the 2013 reorganisation, it was a town (belde). The postal code for the village is 03580.

Geography
The village is located at the western end of the Karahisar Plain and has a continental climate, hot and dry summers, cold and snowy winters. Rainfall is generally sparse.
The economy is mainly agriculture accounting for about 60% to 75% of the population with crops including Apples, apricots and Sugar beet and potato are the most important industrial plants.

History
The ancient city of Dioclea was located near modern Yeşilhisar (formerly called Ahırhisar), while some assume that it was located near modern Doğlat.

References

Villages in Hocalar District